Eretis mixta is a species of butterfly in the family Hesperiidae. It is found in Ethiopia and southern Sudan.

References

Butterflies described in 1937
Celaenorrhinini